Shalvar (also Romanized as Shalvār; also known as Chalaar, Chālvār, and Chalwār) is a village in Sonbolabad Rural District, Soltaniyeh District, Abhar County, Zanjan Province, Iran. At the 2006 census, its population was 121, in 32 families.

References 

Populated places in Abhar County